The 2010 European Mixed Curling Championship was held at the Greenacres Curling Club in Howwood, Scotland. Scotland defeated Switzerland in the final to claim their third title. Germany won the bronze.

Teams

Standings

Playoffs

External links
Greenacres Curling Club

 
European Mixed Curling Championship
2010 in curling
Sport in Renfrewshire
International curling competitions hosted by Scotland
2010 in Scottish sport